Adolf von Bomhard (6 January 1891 in Augsburg – 19 July 1976) was an SS-Gruppenführer and  Generalleutnant of the Ordnungspolizei (Orpo; order police) in Nazi Germany. In the post-war era he was Bürgermeister of Prien am Chiemsee.

During the First World War, Bomhard saw service as an officer in the Bavarian Army, eventually finishing the war as adjutant to Franz Ritter von Epp. Bomhard would later write and publish the history of his regiment.

Bomhard was sent to Kyiv in November 1942 to succeed  as head of police in Reichskommissariat Ukraine. Bomhard followed the same path as his predecessor of integrating police operations with the activities of the SS in the area. Retaining that position until October 1943, Bomhard took an important role in ideological instruction of the Ukrainian police in the Nazi Weltanschauung.
 
After the Second World War ended, Bomhard served between 1960 and 1966 as mayor of Prien am Chiemsee and received honorary citizenship there in 1971 which was posthumously renounced by the city council in 2013. He was also involved in societies for former members of the police.

See also
List SS-Gruppenführer

References

External link

1891 births
1976 deaths
Military personnel from Augsburg
People from the Kingdom of Bavaria
SS-Gruppenführer
Recipients of the Iron Cross (1914), 1st class
German police chiefs
Mayors of places in Bavaria
Military personnel of Bavaria
Police of Nazi Germany
Reichskommissariat Ukraine
20th-century Freikorps personnel